Maud Engelina Maria Roetgering is a Dutch football defender, currently playing for FC Twente in the Dutch Eredivisie and has won Dutch national titles on multiple occasions with the club. She has also represented the national team at youth level (Under-17 and Under-19).

Club career
Roetgering first sport was volleyball, it was only when she was around ten years old that she started playing football at amateur club SV Enter. In 2007 she arrived at FC Twente and during her first year, she was combining training at both clubs and playing during the weekends for SV Enter but due to the training at FC Twente her level rapidly improved and she left SV Enter.

At FC Twente she progressed through the youth teams and in 2009 came to the first team. With the club she competed in the Eredivisie (Dutch League), BeNe League (Belgian and Dutch leagues combined League from 2012 to 2015), KNVB Women's Cup (Dutch Cup), BeNe Super Cup (Belgian and Dutch Cup, from 2011 to 2012) and the UEFA Women's Champions League.

International career
She has played in the youth Dutch national teams (Under-17 and Under-19), taking part in the 2011 U-19 European Championship.

She has been also selected for the national senior team to participate at trainings and compose the squad, but is yet to make her debut.

Honours
FC Twente
 BeNe League (2): 2012–13, 2013–14
 Eredivisie (8): 2010–11, 2012–13*, 2013–14*, 2014–15*, 2015–16, 2018-19, 2020-21, 2021-22
 KNVB Women's Cup (1): 2014–15
*During the BeNe League period (2012 to 2015), the highest placed Dutch team is considered as national champion by the Royal Dutch Football Association.

References

1992 births
Living people
Sportspeople from Almelo
Dutch women's footballers
Women's association football defenders
Eredivisie (women) players
FC Twente (women) players
Footballers from Overijssel